In mathematics, and especially differential topology and gauge theory, Donaldson's theorem states that a definite intersection form of a compact, oriented, smooth manifold of dimension 4 is diagonalisable. The original version of the theorem required the manifold to be simply connected, but it was later improved to apply to 4-manifolds with any fundamental group.

History
The theorem was proved by Simon Donaldson. This was a contribution cited for his Fields medal in 1986.

Idea of proof
Donaldson's proof utilizes the moduli space  of solutions to the anti-self-duality equations on a principal -bundle  over the four-manifold . By the Atiyah–Singer index theorem, the dimension of the moduli space is given by

This moduli space is non-compact and generically smooth, with singularities occurring only at the points corresponding to reducible connections, of which there are exactly  many. Results of Clifford Taubes and Karen Uhlenbeck show that whilst  is non-compact, its structure at infinity can be readily described.

.

The work of Taubes and Uhlenbeck essentially concerns constructing sequences of ASD connections on the four-manifold  with curvature becoming infinitely concentrated at any given single point . For each such point, in the limit one obtains a unique singular ASD connection, which becomes a well-defined smooth ASD connection at that point using Uhlenbeck's removable singularity theorem.

Donaldson observed that the singular points in the interior of  corresponding to reducible connections could also be described: they looked like cones over the complex projective plane , with its orientation reversed.

Secondly, glue in a copy of  itself at infinity.

Extensions
Michael Freedman had previously shown that any unimodular symmetric bilinear form is realized as the intersection form of some closed, oriented four-manifold. Combining this result with the Serre classification theorem and Donaldson's theorem, several interesting results can be seen:

1) Any non-diagonalizable intersection form gives rise to a four-dimensional topological manifold with no differentiable structure (so cannot be smoothed).

2) Two smooth simply-connected 4-manifolds are homeomorphic, if and only if, their intersection forms have the same rank, signature, and parity.

See also
Unimodular lattice
Donaldson theory
Yang–Mills equations
Rokhlin's theorem

Notes

References

Differential topology
Theorems in topology
Quadratic forms